The Dallas–Fort Worth Film Critics Association: Top 10 Films is a list of 10 films selected by the Dallas–Fort Worth Film Critics Association to honor the best films of the year.

List
 † = Winner of the Academy Award for Best Picture

1990s

 1990:
 Dances with Wolves †
 Goodfellas
 Reversal of Fortune
 The Grifters
 Awakenings
 Metropolitan
 Miller's Crossing
 Avalon
 Edward Scissorhands
 The Freshman

 1991:
 JFK
 The Silence of the Lambs †
 Beauty and the Beast
 Boyz n the Hood
 Thelma & Louise
 Bugsy
 Grand Canyon
 The Fisher King
 Barton Fink
 The Prince of Tides

 1992:
 Unforgiven †
 The Player
 Malcolm X
 Howards End
 The Crying Game
 Aladdin
 A Few Good Men
 Passion Fish
 Scent of a Woman
 A League of Their Own

 1993:
 Schindler's List †
 The Piano
 King of the Hill
 The Remains of the Day
 The Fugitive
 In the Name of the Father
 The Nightmare Before Christmas
 The Age of Innocence
 Philadelphia
 Sleepless in Seattle

 1994:
 Pulp Fiction
 Forrest Gump †
 The Shawshank Redemption
 The Lion King
 Three Colours: Red
 Quiz Show
 Hoop Dreams
 Heavenly Creatures
 Little Women
 Four Weddings and a Funeral

 1995:
 Leaving Las Vegas
 Apollo 13
 Babe
 Braveheart †
 Toy Story
 A Little Princess
 The Usual Suspects
 Se7en
 Sense and Sensibility
 Heat

 1996:
 Fargo
 Secrets & Lies
 Hamlet
 The English Patient †
 Jerry Maguire
 Shine
 Trainspotting
 Courage Under Fire
 Lone Star
 Breaking the Waves

 1997:
 L.A. Confidential
 Titanic †
 The Sweet Hereafter
 Good Will Hunting
 The Wings of the Dove
 Boogie Nights
 The Rainmaker
 Contact
 The Full Monty
 As Good as It Gets

 1998:
 Saving Private Ryan
 The Thin Red Line
 The Truman Show
 Life Is Beautiful
 Shakespeare in Love †
 Gods and Monsters
 The Big Lebowski
 Elizabeth
 A Simple Plan
 Out of Sight

 1999:
 American Beauty †
 The Sixth Sense
 The Iron Giant
 The Insider
 Toy Story 2
 The Matrix
 Being John Malkovich
 Fight Club
 Magnolia
 The Green Mile

2000s

 2000:
 Traffic Crouching Tiger, Hidden Dragon Gladiator †
 O Brother, Where Art Thou? Almost Famous Erin Brockovich Chicken Run Wonder Boys Finding Forrester You Can Count on Me 2001:
 A Beautiful Mind †
 Moulin Rouge!
 Memento
 The Lord of the Rings: The Fellowship of the Ring
 In the Bedroom
 Shrek
 The Man Who Wasn't There
 Mulholland Dr.
 Life as a House
 Amélie

 2002: Chicago †
 Far from Heaven
 The Lord of the Rings: The Two Towers
 The Pianist
 About Schmidt
 Gangs of New York
 Adaptation.
 Road to Perdition
 Catch Me If You Can
 The Hours

 2003: The Lord of the Rings: The Return of the King †
 Cold Mountain
 Mystic River
 Lost in Translation
 Finding Nemo
 American Splendor
 In America
 Big Fish
 Master and Commander: The Far Side of the World
 The Last Samurai

 2004: Million Dollar Baby †
 Sideways
 Finding Neverland
 The Aviator
 Eternal Sunshine of the Spotless Mind
 Ray
 Kinsey
 The Incredibles
 A Very Long Engagement
 Hotel Rwanda

 2005: Brokeback Mountain Capote
 Good Night, and Good Luck.
 Crash †
 Cinderella Man
 Syriana
 Pride & Prejudice
 A History of Violence
 King Kong
 The Three Burials of Melquiades Estrada

 2006: United 93 The Departed †
 Little Miss Sunshine
 The Queen
 Babel
 Letters from Iwo Jima
 Dreamgirls
 Blood Diamond
 Little Children
 Flags of Our Fathers

 2007: No Country for Old Men †
 Juno
 There Will Be Blood
 Atonement
 Michael Clayton
 Into the Wild
 The Diving Bell and the Butterfly
 The Kite Runner
 The Assassination of Jesse James by the Coward Robert Ford
 Charlie Wilson's War

 2008: Slumdog Millionaire †
 Milk
 The Dark Knight
 The Curious Case of Benjamin Button
 The Wrestler
 The Visitor
 Frost/Nixon
 Doubt
 WALL-E
 Happy-Go-Lucky

 2009: Up in the Air The Hurt Locker †
 Precious
 Up
 An Education
 A Serious Man
 Inglourious Basterds
 District 9
 Avatar
 Fantastic Mr. Fox

2010s

 2010: The Social Network The King's Speech †
 Black Swan
 127 Hours
 Winter's Bone
 Inception
 The Fighter
 True Grit
 The Town
 The Kids Are All Right

 2011: The Descendants The Artist †
 Extremely Loud & Incredibly Close
 Midnight in Paris
 The Tree of Life
 Hugo
 50/50
 Drive
 Shame
 Moneyball

 2012: Lincoln Argo †
 Zero Dark Thirty
 Life of Pi
 Les Misérables
 Moonrise Kingdom
 Silver Linings Playbook
 Skyfall
 The Master
 Beasts of the Southern Wild

 2013: 12 Years a Slave †
 Gravity
 Nebraska
 American Hustle
 Dallas Buyers Club
 Her
 The Wolf of Wall Street
 Inside Llewyn Davis
 Captain Phillips
 Mud

 2014: Birdman †
 Boyhood
 The Imitation Game
 The Theory of Everything
 The Grand Budapest Hotel
 Whiplash
 Gone Girl
 Selma
 Wild
 Nightcrawler

 2015: Spotlight †
 The Revenant
 Carol
 Sicario
 Mad Max: Fury Road
 The Big Short
 The Martian
 Room
 The Danish Girl
 Brooklyn

 2016: Moonlight †
 Manchester by the Sea
 La La Land
 Hell or High Water
 Arrival
 Jackie
 Loving
 20th Century Women
 Hacksaw Ridge
 Silence

 2017: The Shape of Water †
 The Post
 Lady Bird
 Call Me by Your Name
 Get Out
 Dunkirk
 Three Billboards Outside Ebbing, Missouri
 I, Tonya
 The Florida Project
 Darkest Hour

 2018: A Star Is Born Roma
 The Favourite
 Vice
 BlacKkKlansman
 Black Panther
 Green Book †
 If Beale Street Could Talk
 Eighth Grade
 Can You Ever Forgive Me?

 2019: 1917 Marriage Story
 Parasite †
 The Irishman
 Once Upon a Time in Hollywood
 Jojo Rabbit
 Little Women
 The Farewell
 The Two Popes
 Knives Out

2020s

 2020: Nomadland †
 Promising Young Woman
 The Trial of the Chicago 7
 Minari
 One Night in Miami...
 Mank
 Ma Rainey's Black Bottom
 Sound of Metal
 Da 5 Bloods
 First Cow

 2021: The Power of the Dog Belfast
 King Richard
 West Side Story
 Licorice Pizza
 Dune
 Nightmare Alley
 The French Dispatch
 The Lost Daughter
 CODA †

 2022: Everything Everywhere All at Once' The Banshees of Inisherin The Fabelmans Tár Top Gun: Maverick Women Talking The Whale Guillermo del Toro's Pinocchio Babylon The Woman King''

References

External links
 Official website

Top 10
Top film lists